Edre Elskamp is an Aruban football player. He made one appearance for the Aruba national team in 2002 as a substitute.

National team statistics

References

Living people
Aruban footballers
Association football midfielders
Year of birth missing (living people)
Aruba international footballers